Dexter Canipe (born May 29, 1960) is an American racing driver who won the NASCAR Weekly Series national championship in 1997. Dexter also won the 1998 Taco Bell 300 at Martinsville Speedway, the biggest race of the year in Late Model Stock Car racing.

Driving a Late Model Stock Car owned by Dwight Huffman and fielded by G&G Motorsports, Canipe won 17 of the 22 races that he entered at Greenville-Pickens Speedway in South Carolina, in his national championship title in the NASCAR Weekly Series in 1997.

He also won the first-ever NASCAR touring series race at Homestead-Miami Speedway when the track opened in 1995, a NASCAR Goody's Dash Series event that preceded the track's Truck series exhibition and Busch series season finale the same weekend.

Canipe attempted one race in NASCAR Busch Series, in 1987, but failed to qualify.

He also competed in 7 Hooters Pro Cup Series events between 1999 and 2000. His best-finish was 10th at USA International Speedway.

Motorsports career results

NASCAR
(key) (Bold – Pole position awarded by qualifying time. Italics – Pole position earned by points standings or practice time. * – Most laps led.)

Busch Series

References

External links
 

1960 births
NASCAR drivers
CARS Tour drivers
Living people